Thomas Reynolds (March 17, 1840January 11, 1919) was an Irish American immigrant, farmer, and Republican politician.  He was a member of the Wisconsin State Assembly, representing Door County during the 1907 and 1909 sessions.  He was the father of —the 26th attorney general of Wisconsin—and the grandfather of —a federal judge and the 36th governor of Wisconsin.

Biography
Reynolds was born in County Longford, Ireland. He fled Ireland around 1865 due to involvement in a plot to incite an Irish revolt against British rule. In 1866, he moved to Madison, Wisconsin. He later settled in Jacksonport, Wisconsin, in Door County, and became involved in the lumber and farming industries. Reynolds died in Jacksonport in 1919 following an illness.

Family
Reynolds married Jane Foley ( 1853–1922). They had ten children.  His brother Charles Reynolds was also a member of the Assembly. Thomas Reynolds was the father of John W. Reynolds, Sr., the 26th Attorney General of Wisconsin, and the grandfather of John W. Reynolds, Jr., the 36th Governor of Wisconsin and a federal judge.

Political career
Reynolds was a member of the Assembly during the 1907 and 1909 sessions. In addition, he was chairman (similar to mayor) and a member of the town board (similar to city council) of Jacksonport. He was a Republican.

References

External links
Wisconsin Genealogy Trails

Politicians from County Longford
Irish emigrants to the United States (before 1923)
Politicians from Madison, Wisconsin
People from Door County, Wisconsin
Republican Party members of the Wisconsin State Assembly
Mayors of places in Wisconsin
Wisconsin city council members
Businesspeople in timber
Farmers from Wisconsin
1840 births
1919 deaths